Ol Kalou is a town in Kenya. It is the capital of Nyandarua County of the former Central Province. It is located west of Aberdare range and 40 kilometres east of Nakuru. Ol Kalou is connected by road to Gilgil, Nyahururu and Nakuru. Ol Kalou forms a town council with a population of 47,795, of whom 15,186 are classified urban (1999 census).

Ol Kalou town has five wards: Gichungo, Kaimbaga, Ol Kalou, Ol Kalou Central and Rurii. All of them are located within Ol Kalou Constituency. Ol Kalou is also headquarters of Ol Kalou division of Nyandarua Disetrict.

References 

Nyandarua County
Populated places in Central Province (Kenya)
County capitals in Kenya